Turkmenistan is a country with large potential for an expanded tourism industry. Many of its Central Asian cities were main points of trade on the Silk Road, linking Eastern and Western civilizations. Many neighboring countries (including Kazakhstan, Uzbekistan, and Iran) promote their countries based on their location along the Great Silk Road. Tourism has grown rapidly in recent years. Tourists from abroad are deterred by the restrictive visa policy regime with all countries of the world. Tourism is regulated by the Tourism Committee of Turkmenistan.

Historical sites 

There are three World Heritage Sites in Turkmenistan.

Nisa (also Parthaunisa) was an ancient city, located near modern-day Bagyr, a neighbourhood in Ashgabat 18 km southwest of downtown. Nisa is described by some as one of the first capitals of the Parthians. It is traditionally assumed to have been founded by Arsaces I (reigned c. 250 BC–211 BC), and was reputedly the royal necropolis of the Parthian kings, although it has not been established that the fortress at Nisa was either a royal residence or a mausoleum.

Merv, formerly an Achaemenid Satrapy of Margiana, and later Alexandria and Antiochia in Margiana, was a major oasis-city in Central Asia, on the historical Silk Road, located near today's Mary. Several cities have existed on this site, which is significant for the interchange of culture and politics at a site of major strategic value. It is claimed that Merv was briefly the largest city in the world in the 12th century.

Konye-Urgench is a municipality of about 30,000 inhabitants in north-eastern Turkmenistan, just south out the border with Uzbekistan. It is the site of the ancient town of Ürgenç, which contains the unexcavated ruins of the 12th-century capital of Khwarezm. Since 2005, the ruins of Old Urgench have been protected by UNESCO as a World Heritage Site. (See List of World Heritage Sites in Turkmenistan)

Resorts and nature tourism 
The Caspian Sea coast of Turkmenistan is the site of a number of popular sea resorts, including the Awaza National Resort Zone.

Wildlife areas in the desert and other attractions 
Desert fauna of Karakum include many kinds of rare animals. There is a Karakum nature reserve at the flood-land drained by the Amu Darya.

Near Derweze village in the middle of the Karakum Desert is a natural gas deposit. While drilling in 1971, Soviet geologists tapped into a cavern filled with natural gas. To avoid poisonous gas discharge, it was decided the best solution was to burn it off. Geologists had hoped the fire would use all the fuel in a matter of days, but the gas is still burning today. Locals have dubbed the cavern the "Door to Hell".

Accessibility of the country 

Most trips to Turkmenistan begin with arrival at the capital Ashgabat or the seaside town Turkmenbashy. Ashgabat has a modern international airport, which is the base of Turkmenistan Airlines. The airport is served by S7 Airlines, Turkish Airlines, Flydubai, Belavia and China Southern Airlines as well as the national carrier, Turkmenistan Airlines. Another five airports in Turkmenistan (Turkmenabat, Dashoguz, Mary, Turkmenbashy, and Kerki) have international status. Because of current restrictions, tickets for domestic flights cannot be booked or purchased more than 14 days prior to departure.

COVID pandemic
Due to the COVID-19 global pandemic, scheduled international flights have been curtailed, and only special charter flights are allowed in and out of the country. Such flights arrive at Turkmenabat, where arriving passengers undergo a 21-day quarantine.

Museums 

Most museums are located in the major cities of Turkmenistan such as Ashgabat, Turkmenabat, Balkanabat, Mary and Dashoguz. Some of these include:

Ashgabat National Museum of History 
Halk Hakydasy Memorial Complex 
Mary Museum 
The State Museum of the State Cultural Center of Turkmenistan 
Turkmen Carpet Museum 
Turkmen Museum of Fine Arts

The city of Serdar features a fine local history museum, and the city of Bereket a railroad museum.

Number of tourists annually
 In 2007 Turkmenistan was visited by 8,200 tourists. This number is low relative to local population. In 2007 the population of Turkmenistan stood at 4,750,000 inhabitants. This gives a ratio of 1 tourist to every 579 locals. In 2016, that number had reportedly risen to 9,000, and in 2019, to 14,438.

Foreign visitor arrivals in 2011
The three following countries had the most tourists visiting Turkmenistan in 2011:

: 3874
: 1143
: 531

See also
 Visa policy of Turkmenistan

References

External links

   Official state web-site of the Tourism Committee of Turkmenistan [Website disabled as of 5/5/2022]

 
Turkmenistan